A sugar bowl is a small bowl designed for holding sugar or sugar cubes.

Sugar bowl may also refer to:

 Sugar Bowl, a college football game
 Tulane Stadium, the game's original venue (1934–1974), sometimes informally called the "Sugar Bowl" during that time
 Sugar Bowl (St. Johns, Michigan), a commercial building in St. Johns, Michigan
 Sugar Bowl Ski Resort, a ski resort near Lake Tahoe, California
 The Sugar Bowl, a fictitious hangout in the Arthur book and television series

Other uses 
 Sugar bowl (legal maxim), a term used in constitutional law